Max Jean-Gilles (born November 19, 1983) is a former American football guard. He played college football for the  University of Georgia, and received All-American honors.  He was selected by the Philadelphia Eagles in the fourth round of the 2006 NFL Draft.

Early years
Jean-Gilles attended North Miami Beach High School in North Miami Beach, Florida and was a letterman in high school football.  In football, he was a two-time first-team all-state selection and a two-time first-team all-county selection.

College career
Jean-Gilles attended the University of Georgia, where he played for coach Mark Richt's Georgia Bulldogs football team from 2002 to 2005.  Following his senior season in 2005, he was a first-team All-Southeastern Conference (SEC) selection and was recognized as a consensus first-team All-American.  He was a key starter of the Bulldogs team that defeated the LSU Tigers by a score of 34–14 to win the 2005 SEC Championship Game.

Professional career

Philadelphia Eagles
Jean-Gilles was chosen in the fourth round with the 99th overall pick by the Philadelphia Eagles. Many people did expect him to go higher because of his athleticism and playing ability, but his inability to control his weight might have played into that decision. He and offensive tackle Winston Justice, who was drafted in the second round also by the Eagles, were supposed to have helped with the rebuilding process of the offensive line. On July 10, 2006, Jean-Gilles signed a four-year contract with the Eagles.

On September 23, 2007, Jean-Gilles made his regular season debut for the Eagles, subbing in for an injured Shawn Andrews.

Jean-Gilles' 2008 season was cut short on Thanksgiving night against the Arizona Cardinals when he fractured his ankle and was placed on injured reserve.

During the 2009 season, after a knee injury to starting center Jamaal Jackson in Week 16 against the Denver Broncos, starting right guard Nick Cole shifted over to center, while Jean-Gilles came in at right guard for the rest of the game. With Jackson out for the year with a torn anterior cruciate ligament (ACL), Jean-Gilles would continue to start at right guard for the rest of the year.

He was re-signed to a one-year contract on April 15, 2010. Due to the Eagles not making the roster deadline during final cuts because of a trade, Jean-Gilles had to be released in order to meet the roster requirement on September 4. He was re-signed on September 5.

Cincinnati Bengals
On August 2, 2011, Jean-Gilles signed a one-year contract with the Cincinnati Bengals, but was released on September 3.

Carolina Panthers
Jean-Gilles signed with the Carolina Panthers on September 4, 2011, but was released on September 11.

Lincoln Haymakers
Jean-Gilles signed with the Lincoln Haymakers of the Champions Professional Indoor Football League on August 27, 2013.

Portland Thunder
Jean-Gilles was assigned to the Portland Thunder on October 9, 2013. On August 7, 2015, the Thunder voided his assignment.

Personal life
Jean-Gilles' parents immigrated to the United States from Haiti in the  early 1980s. He has a son, Marcus. Jean-Gilles underwent lap-band surgery in May 2010 in order to lose weight. It was reported that he weighed about  during the offseason. Jean-Gilles is the first active NFL player to undergo lap-band surgery.

References

External links

Official website

Philadelphia Eagles bio

1983 births
Living people
All-American college football players
American football offensive guards
American sportspeople of Haitian descent
Carolina Panthers players
Cincinnati Bengals players
Georgia Bulldogs football players
Haitian players of American football
Lincoln Haymakers players
Philadelphia Eagles players
Portland Thunder players
North Miami Senior High School alumni
Players of American football from Miami